The name Ted has been used for three tropical cyclones worldwide: two in the Western Pacific Ocean and one in the Australian Region.

In the Western Pacific:
 Severe Tropical Storm Ted (1992) (T9219, 19W, Maring) – affected Luzon, southern Taiwan, eastern China, and South Korea, killing 61.
 Severe Tropical Storm Ted (1995) (T9516, 24W) – crossed the Philippines as a tropical low before striking southern China as a Category 1-equivalent typhoon.

In the Australian Region:
Cyclone Ted (1976) – made landfall in Queensland, causing 2 fatalities and incurring $49 million worth of damages.

Pacific typhoon set index articles
Australian region cyclone set index articles